The 1919 Montana State Bobcats football team was an American football team that represented the Montana State College (later renamed Montana State University) as a member of the Rocky Mountain Conference (RMC) during the 1919 college football season. In its first and only season under head coach Walter D. Powell, the Bobcats compiled a 1–3–1 record (0–3 against RMC opponents) and was outscored by a total of 97 to 49.

Homer Taylor was the team captain.

Schedule

Personnel

Players
The following players participated on the 1919 Montana State football team:

 Joe Bush
 Anker Christensen - center
 Devore
 Durkee
 Fred Finch
 Garven
 Norman Hibbert - lineman
 Kenneth King - halfback
 Victor Larse - lineman
 Ladimer Mashin - end
 George "Blubber" McFarlin
 Lloyd Morphy - tackle
 Henry Oberle - lineman
 Eugene Robertson
 Street
 Homer Taylor - quarterback and captain
 Willard Tobey - lineman
 Wakefield
 Wildman - lineman
 Ralph Winwood

Staff
 Walter D. Powell - coach
 Harold "Dick" Dickson - football manager

References

Montana State
Montana State Bobcats football seasons
Montana State Bobcats football